Women and Captains First is the debut solo album by The Damned guitarist Captain Sensible, released on 3 September 1982 by A&M Records. It features contributions from producer Tony Mansfield, Robyn Hitchcock and the band Dolly Mixture. The album was preceded by the singles "Happy Talk" and "Wot", which peaked at numbers 1 and 26 on the UK Singles Chart, respectively. The album reached No. 64 on the UK Albums Chart. It was reissued on CD in 2009 by Cherry Red Records, including six bonus tracks.

Background 
Women and Captains First was recorded while Captain Sensible was still a member of punk rock band The Damned. He had released his debut solo record, the three song EP This is Your Captain Speaking, in November 1981 on Crass Records. The producer of Women and Captains First, Tony Mansfield of synth-pop band New Musik, had previously produced The Damned's Friday 13th EP, also released in November 1981. Sensible recorded demos of four of his songs with Mansfield, who then gave them to his manager who took them to A&M Records. Sensible: “I got a solo deal with A&M on the strength of a few tunes The Damned had rejected for being too melodic.” For Sensible, Women and Captains First was a musical departure from The Damned's blend of punk, rock and psychedelic rock influences. Sensible: "Mansfield wasn't into the psychedelic guitar thing. He was into pop. I wanted his '80s synth pop production on my records."

The last song recorded for the album was a cover version of “Happy Talk” from the 1949 Rodgers and Hammerstein musical South Pacific. Sensible: “Needing one song to complete an album, producer Tony Mansfield told me to rummage through my records to find something worthy of a cover version." Sensible was instructed to find "something we could do something a bit weird with" and ended up choosing “Happy Talk” from his parents’ record collection. When A&M heard the finished recording they "smelled a hit", according to Sensible. Initially, he wouldn't let them release it as a single. "Well, until they lied that a well-known artist from a big label was doing their own version and I'd lose my guaranteed number 1. So I said yes." Released as the album's first single in June 1982, “Happy Talk” topped the UK Singles Chart for two weeks in July. The success of the single launched Sensible's solo career, and he quickly found himself in constant demand for TV appearances, radio and magazines. "One minute I was living at home with my mum and dad, and in a punk group and being the disgrace of the neighbourhood, and the next minute everyone thought I was this wonderful novelty song artist, and it was lunacy."

Second single "Wot" was a Top 10 hit in several European countries and a Top 30 hit in the UK, US and Australia. The album's third single, "Croydon", failed to chart.

Critical reception 

In a retrospective review for AllMusic, Mark Deming wrote: "Part of the idea behind the album was to show he could do more than just straightforward punk rock, and there's no arguing he succeeded." Deming felt that the "proto-rap" of "Wot" and the "domestic squalor" of "A Nice Cup of Tea" are "comic", but they are also "well-crafted pop tunes that deliver the goods". "Croydon" and "Brenda Parts 1 & 2," are described as "smart and atmospheric with a faint psychedelic edge", and "Croydon" also reveals a "subtle but clear John Lennon influence". The traditional jazz arrangement of "Nobody's Sweetheart", according to Deming, is "an effective bit of retro fun". In his conclusion, Deming wrote that most of Women and Captains First is dominated by "synthesizers, drum machines, and breathy female backing vocals", giving the album "a slick and instantly recognizable '80s sound" that hasn't dated well.

Track listing

Personnel 
Credits adapted from the album's liner notes.

Musicians
Captain Sensible - vocals, guitar, organ
Tony Mansfield - synthesizer, percussion
Dolly Mixture - vocals
Robyn Hitchcock - twelve-string guitar ("Brenda Parts 1 & 2")
Rod Bowkett - noises ("Happy Talk") 
Beale Street Jazz Band - instruments ("Nobody's Sweetheart")
Production
Tony Mansfield - producer
Matthew Fisher - engineer
Andy Gierus - additional engineer
Chris Ludwinski - additional engineer
Jules Bowen - additional engineer
Mark Proctor - additional engineer
Simon Smart - additional engineer
Mixed at Eel Pie Studios, T.M.C. Studios and Ridge Farm Studio
Bonus tracks
"Jimi Hendrix's Strat" and "Damned on 45" were produced by Captain Sensible
"I Can't Stand It (Demo)" and "Strawberry Dross" were recorded in Sensible's bedroom on a TEAC Portastudio
"Joe Meek" is an unfinished 1980s track, completed by Sensible for the 2009 reissue

Chart positions

References

External links

1982 debut albums
Captain Sensible albums
A&M Records albums
Albums produced by Tony Mansfield